The Pennsylvanian is a  daily daytime Amtrak train running between New York and Pittsburgh via Philadelphia. The trains travel across the Appalachian Mountains, through Pennsylvania's capital Harrisburg, the Pennsylvania Dutch Country, suburban and central Philadelphia, and New Jersey en route to New York. The entire train ride takes about 9 hours total: 1.5 hours between New York and Philadelphia, 2 hours between Philadelphia and Harrisburg, and 5.5 hours between Harrisburg and Pittsburgh.

The Pennsylvanian uses the same Amtrak-owned Philadelphia to Harrisburg Main Line as the Keystone Service trains, but continues further west via the Pittsburgh Line through Altoona and the Allegheny Mountains, eventually terminating its run in Pittsburgh. The Main Line and Pittsburgh Line collectively make up the Keystone Corridor, a federally-designated corridor for high-speed rail service.

History 
Prior to Amtrak, the Pennsylvanian route was covered by the Duquesne, named after Fort Duquesne in Pittsburgh, and by the Juniata, both trains operated by the Pennsylvania Railroad and from 1968 to 1971 by the PRR's successor, the Penn Central. The Duquesne had a long history, finally becoming a daily New York–Pittsburgh train on October 25, 1959, numbered 16 eastbound and 25 westbound. When the Pennsylvania Railroad's successor, Penn Central, was formed in 1968, it continued to operate the Duquesne and the Juniata.

With the start of Amtrak operations on May 1, 1971, the Duquesne was renamed the Keystone and renumbered 42 westbound and 43 eastbound with the first Amtrak timetable on November 14, 1971. The Keystone was discontinued on April 30, 1972.

The immediate impetus for the Pennsylvanian was the discontinuance of the National Limited, a New York–Kansas City train which had provided service over the corridor. That train, in turn, was the successor of the famed Spirit of St Louis.  The Pennsylvanian began on April 27, 1980, as a state-supported daylight train between Philadelphia and Pittsburgh, with connecting service to New York via the Philadelphian (a Clocker) westbound and the Montrealer eastbound.

At the time the Pennsylvanian was inaugurated, the Broadway Limited was departing Pittsburgh at an inconvenient early morning hour. The new train ran with Amfleet equipment, including a cafe car. Pennsylvania agreed to pay 20% of the train's costs for the first year, or $580,000, with the state and Amtrak eventually splitting the costs 50/50 by the third year.

Between 1981 and 1983, Pennsylvanian equipment was turned every night to operate a second state-supported train, the Fort Pitt, which ran from Pittsburgh to Altoona. Amtrak withdrew this train in early 1983 after the Pennsylvania Department of Transportation (PennDOT) declined to continue subsidizing the increased operation. At the time the Fort Pitt carried 30 passengers per day. On October 30, 1983, the Pennsylvanian was extended to New York City, eliminating the transfer at Philadelphia.

After significant ridership gains in 1984, PennDOT proposed that a second train be added to the route. PennDOT and Amtrak would have split the costs evenly. Amtrak officials were favorable, but budget problems stalled the plan.

In the late 1980s passenger-rail groups urged Amtrak to extend the Pennsylvanian to Cleveland, Ohio. Proposals included new stations in Sewickley and Beaver Falls. Pressure increased in 1989 when Amtrak announced the re-routing of the Broadway Limited and Capitol Limited over that same route as part of a restructuring of routes in Indiana. As part of this change, the Capitol Limited began serving the Cleveland–Pittsburgh route, albeit in the middle of the night. Amtrak and PennDOT considered two routes for an extended Pennsylvanian: one via Alliance, Ohio (following the route of the Capitol Limited) and one via Youngstown, Ohio (partially following the Broadway Limited) with a new stop in New Castle, Pennsylvania.

On November 7, 1998, Amtrak extended the Pennsylvanian through to Chicago along the route of the Capitol Limited via Toledo, finally bringing a daylight connection to Cleveland. The Three Rivers continued to run over a different schedule via Akron and Fostoria. As part of the change Amtrak truncated the eastern end to Philadelphia, enabling the train to complete the run within a single day. The change was driven by Amtrak's growing mail and express business; Pittsburgh–Philadelphia ridership suffered. Amtrak returned the Pennsylvanian to the New York–Pittsburgh route on January 27, 2003, citing low ridership and Amtrak's withdrawal from the express freight business. On November 1, 2004, Amtrak merged the Pennsylvanian and Three Rivers, keeping the latter name with a western terminus in Chicago. Amtrak had sought $2.5 million in assistance from Pennsylvania to keep both trains running. On March 8, 2005, Amtrak truncated service to Pittsburgh–New York and restored the Pennsylvanian name to the route.

The train has been primarily financed by the Pennsylvania Department of Transportation since October 1, 2013, when the Rail Safety Improvement Act of 2008 took effect. In late 2019, the train began operating with a baggage car for checked baggage and bicycle handling at New York, Newark, Philadelphia, Lancaster, Harrisburg, Altoona, Johnstown and Pittsburgh. In March 2020, service on the Pennsylvanian was suspended as part of a round of service reduction in response to the ongoing COVID-19 pandemic. Service resumed on June 1, 2020.

Operation

Equipment 

Most Pennsylvanian trains consist of six cars hauled by a locomotive.

The passenger cars are the Amfleet series built by the Budd Company in the mid 1970s to early-1980s. Most trains include an Amfleet club car which has a combination of Business Class seating with a Café (food service/lounge) and four Coach Class cars. The train also carries a Viewliner series baggage car for checked baggage service.

Between Philadelphia and New York, the service operates over the Northeast Corridor which has overhead electric wires and trains are pulled by Siemens ACS-64 electric locomotives at speeds up to 

In the coming years all equipment will be replaced with Amtrak Airo trainsets, the railroad's branding of its combination of Siemens Venture passenger cars and a Siemens Charger diesel-electric locomotive. The trainsets for the Pennsylvanian will have six passenger cars, which will include a food service area and a mix of 2x2 Coach Class and 2x1 Business Class seating. The car closest to the locomotive will be a specialized "Auxiliary Power Vehicle" which will include a pantograph to collect power from overhead lines and will feed it to four traction motors in the car, and via a DC link cable, to the four traction motors in the locomotive. The arrangement will offer a near seamless transition between power sources at Philadelphia, a process that currently requires a time-consuming locomotive change.

Classes of service 
All classes of service include complimentary WiFi, an electric outlet (120 V, 60 Hz AC) at each seat, reading lamps, fold-out tray tables. Reservations are required on all trains, tickets may be purchased online, from an agent at some stations, a ticketing machine at most stations, or, at a higher cost, from the conductor on the train.
Coach Class: 2x2 seating. Passengers self-select seats on a first-come, first-served basis.
Business Class: 2x1 seating with more legroom than coach. Passengers receive complimentary soft drinks.

Ridership 
Over fiscal years 2009–2016, ridership grew from 199,484 to 223,114, an increase of 10.6%. Ridership peaked at 231,720 in FY 2015. Ticket revenue grew from $7,819,404 to $11,555,451, an increase of 47.8%.

Route 

The Pennsylvanian follows the Pennsylvania Railroad's Main Line over the following trackage:
Amtrak: New York– Philadelphia– Harrisburg
 Northeast Corridor, New York to Philadelphia
 Keystone Corridor, Philadelphia to Harrisburg
Norfolk Southern Railway: Harrisburg– Pittsburgh
 Pittsburgh Line

Station stops

Future 
There is currently no through service west of Pittsburgh, though the Capitol Limited continues to provide service to Chicago. As part of its federally mandated analysis of the worst-performing long-distance routes, Amtrak determined that reinstating a through-car connection with the Pennsylvanian would result in the highest gain in monetary and customer service measurements of possible options. To implement this, Amtrak plans to operate a Viewliner sleeper car, an Amfleet cafe car and two Amfleet coaches between Chicago and New York approximating the historic Broadway Limited, via the Capitol Limited and Pennsylvanian. This would begin when funding and equipment is available. On January 28, 2011, it was announced that Pennsylvania had received a $750,000 grant from the federal government to study expanding service westwards from Harrisburg to Pittsburgh along the route of the Pennsylvanian, including higher speeds and additional frequencies.

The Pennsylvania State Rail Plan 2020 calls for a second round-trip Amtrak train between Pittsburgh and New York City with one trip beginning and terminating in Cleveland. The second trip was then projected to begin during the fiscal year running from October 2023 to September 2024. The feasibility, schedule, and cost of adding a second train are underway. In June 2022, the state and Norfolk Southern announced an agreement for a $200 million capacity improvement, with a second Pennsylvanian round trip added by 2025.

References

Notes

External links 

Amtrak routes
Passenger rail transportation in New York (state)
Passenger rail transportation in New Jersey
Passenger rail transportation in Pennsylvania
Transportation in Pittsburgh
Railway services introduced in 1980